State Route 94 (SR-94), located entirely within Grand County, is a  minor collector state highway in the U.S. state of Utah. The highway serves as a spur route into Thompson Springs. The highway was formed in 1969, at the same time Interstate 70 (I-70) was constructed through the area.

Route description
Located entirely in Grand County's Thompson Springs, SR-94 begins at a diamond interchange with exit 187 of I-70 and heads north as a two–lane undivided highway. The road turns to the northeast after passing a Shell gas station, intersecting a local road, and then the highway forms the western border of a Utah Department of Transportation (UDOT) maintenance facility. After the maintenance facility the route turns north again and passes a mobile home court and comes to an end at an intersection with Old Cisco Highway. Across Old Cisco Highway is the former Thompson railroad depot of the Denver and Rio Grande Western Railroad.

Every year, UDOT conducts a series of surveys on its highways in the state to measure traffic volume. This is expressed in terms of average annual daily traffic (AADT), a measure of traffic volume for any average day of the year. In 2012, UDOT calculated that 740 vehicles traveled along the highway, with 51 percent of the traffic consisted of trucks. UDOT has classified the roadway as a minor collector route.

History

State Route 94 was formed in 1969 as a connector from I-70 to Thompson Springs. When I-70 was constructed through the area, it bypassed the town, creating a need for a connector road. The northern terminus of the route is old US-6/US-50.

Major intersections

See also

References

094
 094
Streets in Utah